Dennis Paoli is a screenwriter and playwright known for his work on horror films, specifically those directed by Stuart Gordon. He has written or co-written five of Gordon's films, including  (1985) and From Beyond (1986). He has also collaborated with Gordon on the stage productions of Bleacher Bums, Re-Animator: The Musical, and Nevermore: An Evening with Edgar Allan Poe, and on two episodes of the Showtime horror television series Masters of Horror.

Paoli serves as the coordinator of the Hunter College writing center. He established the Heidi Paoli Fund in honor of his late wife ( 1987) to distribute donations to approved cancer charities from a variety of fundraising sources.

Filmography

Film

Television

Stage 

 An  indicates a story writer.

References

External links 

American male screenwriters
American male television writers
20th-century American dramatists and playwrights
21st-century American dramatists and playwrights
Hunter College faculty
American male dramatists and playwrights